John Chipman (born June 28, 1926) is a Canadian-born American economist who is a noted expert on the econometrics of international trade. He was Regents' Professor of Economics at the University of Minnesota, where he currently holds emeritus status. He was elected to the American Academy of Arts and Sciences in 1979 and to the National Academy of Sciences in 1993.

Early life and education

John Somerset Chipman was born on June 28, 1926 in Montreal, Canada. He received his B.A. degree from McGill University in 1947 and an M.A. in Economics and Political Science from the same university in 1948. Chipman earned his Ph.D. from Johns Hopkins University in 1951 with a dissertation entitled, "The Theory of Intersectional Money Flows and Income Formation."

Career

Chipman served as Assistant Professor of Economics at Harvard University from 1951 to 1955 before moving to the University of Minnesota in 1955, where he taught until his retirement in 2007. Among his Ph.D. students was Masahiko Aoki. In 1981, he was named Regents' Professor of Economics.

Research

Chipman's research focuses on international trade, econometrics, and welfare economics. He is also an expert on the history of economic thought, and has recently been translating classic economic texts into English, including Italian economist Vilfredo Pareto's 1906 work Manual of Political Economy, which established the economic principle of "Pareto optimality."

References

20th-century American economists
21st-century American economists
1926 births
Fellows of the American Academy of Arts and Sciences
Fellows of the Econometric Society
Living people
Trade economists
United States Council of Economic Advisers
Economic historians
Johns Hopkins University alumni
McGill University alumni